Jaeremi Drijvers (born 12 November 1999) is a Sint Maartener footballer who plays for Dutch club VV Gestel and the Sint Maarten national team.

Youth career 
As a youth Drijvers played for Milton Peters College and was one of the most prolific scorers in the Sint Maarten Soccer Association high school league in 2015. As a senior in 2018, his team won the league championship while Drijvers was the league’s top scorer.

Club career 
Drijvers played club football in the Netherlands with Woenselse Boys and SV Red-White Veldhoven before joining VV WODAN in May 2019. That September he scored as the team put in a dominant performance against VV Hulsel and a victory over ZSC Westerhoven. By 2021 he had returned to the Netherlands, joining VV Gestel. He scored the club's game-winning goal in a 3–2 victory over Wilhelmina Boys in Week 2 of the season.

International career 
In summer 2018 Drijvers represented Sint Maarten in the 2018 CONCACAF U-20 Championship. He went on to score three goals in four appearances. His goals came against Antigua and Barbuda, Belize, and the Dominican Republic.

In May 2018 Drijvers was called up for an unofficial friendly against Saint Barthélemy. Despite Drijvers scoring a hattrick, Sint Maarten were defeated 3–5 after conceding three penalty kicks within the final ten minutes of the match. He went on to make his official senior international debut on 25 July 2018 in a friendly against the British Virgin Islands. He scored his first two senior goals in the eventual 2–3 defeat. He was soon after included in Sint Maarten's roster for 2019–20 CONCACAF Nations League qualifying.

International goals
Scores and results list Sint Maarten's goal tally first.

International career statistics

Youth international goals
Scores and results list Sint Maarten's goal tally first.

Athletics 
Drijvers has also represented Sint Maarten in athletics at the CARIFTA Games.

References

External links

Living people
1999 births
Association football forwards
Sint Maarten international footballers
Dutch Antillean footballers